Asunciónico is a music festival held in Asunción, Paraguay. The main genres of the festival are rock, pop and EDM, and is held in the month of March.

Editions
The second edition was going to be held in 2016, artists included Florence and the Machine, Jack Ü, Mumford & Sons and Noel Gallagher's High Flying Birds, among others, but it was finally cancelled even though tickets were already sold.
The fourth edition was going to be held on March 31 and April 7, 2020, but was finally postponed to the second half of 2020 due to coronavirus pandemic.

The fifth edition scheduled on March 22 and 23 was canceled due to an electric storm that made catastrophic consequences on the scenario Espacio Idesa and adjacent areas in Asuncion, Paraguay.

However, artists like Machine Gun Kelly, LP, among others that were scheduled, perform in places like the hotel they were hosted called (Machine Gun), local pubs of downtown, Asuncion (LP, La Vela Puerca, among others)

Lineups by year

2015

2018

2019

References

External links
Official website

Music festivals in Paraguay
Music festivals established in 2015